Thomas or Tom Dugan may refer to:

Thomas Buchanan Dugan (1858–1940), United States Army brigadier general
Tom Dugan (actor, born 1889) (1889–1955), Irish-born American film and television actor
Tom Dugan (actor, born 1961), American theater, film and television actor

See also  
Thomas Duggan (disambiguation)